Mahaashilpi is a 1966 Indian Kannada-language film, directed by S. V. Doraiswamy and produced by H. B. Jwalanaiah. The film stars H. B. Jwalanaiah, K. S. Ashwath and Jayanthi in the lead roles. The film has musical score by P. Kalinga Rao.

Cast
H. B. Jwalanaiah
K. S. Ashwath
Jayanthi

References

1960s Kannada-language films